Damian Istria (born 24 August 1982) is an Australian artistic gymnast who competed at the 2000 Sydney Olympic Games, and the 2002 and 2006 Commonwealth Games.

He was commemorated on Australian postage stamps following his gold medal at the 2006 Commonwealth Games.

After his competitive gymnastics career he became an acrobat at Cirque du Soleil.

References

External links
 
 
 
 
 
 Damian Istria at the 2006 Commonwealth Games

1982 births
Living people
Australian male artistic gymnasts
Olympic gymnasts of Australia
Gymnasts at the 2000 Summer Olympics
Commonwealth Games gold medallists for Australia
Commonwealth Games silver medallists for Australia
Commonwealth Games medallists in gymnastics
Gymnasts at the 2002 Commonwealth Games
Gymnasts at the 2006 Commonwealth Games
Australian Institute of Sport gymnasts
20th-century Australian people
21st-century Australian people
Medallists at the 2002 Commonwealth Games
Medallists at the 2006 Commonwealth Games